Dan Corry (30 August 1902 – 25 January 1990) was an Irish equestrian. He competed in two events at the 1948 Summer Olympics.

References

External links
 

1902 births
1990 deaths
Irish male equestrians
Olympic equestrians of Ireland
Equestrians at the 1948 Summer Olympics
People from Loughrea